The Khmer Special Forces, also designated 'Khmer SF' for short or Forces Speciales Khmères (FSK) in French, the tier 1 special forces of the Khmer National Armed Forces (commonly known by their French acronym, FANK) during the 1970-75 Cambodian Civil War.

Origins
The history of the Khmer Special Forces began in October 1971, when the 1st Special Forces Group (Airborne) was organized at Phnom Penh under the command of Lieutenant colonel (later, Brigadier general) Thach Reng. The Khmer SF were actually a creation of Lt. Col. Ronnie Mendoza, a Special Forces-qualified US Army officier assigned to the American Military Equipment Delivery Team, Cambodia (MEDTC) assistance program earlier in June 1971.  A prominent member of the MEDTC's Plans and Programs Section, Mendoza focused on providing the Cambodian Army unconventional warfare units capable of carrying out guerrilla operations in the northern and eastern Cambodian provinces under the control of both the North Vietnamese Army (NVA) and their Khmer Rouge allies. Two other SF groups, the 2nd Special Forces Group (Airborne) and the 3rd Special Forces Group (Airborne) were activated in the following year.  
  
Under the auspices of Operation "Freedom Runner" – a FANK training program set up in November 1971 by the United States Special Forces (USSF) –, Khmer Special Forces teams began to be sent to South Vietnam to attend Parachute courses at the ARVN Airborne Training Centre in Long Thành, and the Special Forces' (SF) course at the Army of the Republic of Vietnam Special Forces (LLDB) Dong Ba Thin Training Centre near Cam Ranh Bay.  Manned by the USSF Detachment B-51, assisted by New Zealand Army instructors from the 2nd NZ Army Training Team Vietnam (2 NZATTV) and modelled on the USSF/LLDB own training programs, the course began with four weeks of basic SF skills followed by training in one of six SF job skills: operations and demolitions, light weapons, heavy weapons, humint, radio communications, tactical emergency medical. Other advanced additional courses included anti-tank warfare, combat and patrolling techniques in urban areas, combat search and rescue, counter-ambushes, executive protection, exfil, forward observer, hand and arm signals, hand-to-hand combat, infiltrate the area with a helicopter, jungle warfare, living off the jungle, mountain warfare, parachuting, political warfare, psychological warfare, raiding tactics, reconnaissance tactics, small unit tactics, taekwondo, tracking tactics, use a map and compass, unconventional tactics, and other skills related to special operations. A two-week 'live-fire' field exercise (sometimes complemented by a field operation against NVA/Vietcong (VC) forces in the surrounding areas of the training centre) completed the SF course.

More specialised SF training was carried out in the United States and Thailand since December 1972.  Khmer SF trainees attended technical courses at Fort Bragg, North Carolina, by the USSF 5th Special Forces Group and at the Royal Thai Army (RTA) Special Warfare Centre at Fort Narai, Lopburi Province by the US 46th Special Forces Company; additional Guerrilla and Commando skills were taught by Thai instructors from the Royal Thai Army Special Forces (RTSF) and Royal Thai Police (RTP) Police Aerial Resupply Unit (PARU) at the latter's Phitsanulok and Hua Hin training camps.  Advanced Ranger/LRRP and radio communications' courses also took place in early 1973 at the Military Assistance Command, Vietnam (MACV) Recondo School at Nha Trang, South Vietnam, manned by the USSF Detachment B-36, and at the RTA Recondo School co-located at Ft. Narai, Thailand, before "Freedom Runner" was concluded on July that year.

Structure and organization
The Khmer Special Forces were closely modelled after the United States Special Forces (USSF) and the South Vietnamese Army of the Republic of Vietnam Special Forces (LLDB), with a total unit strength of 350 Officers and enlisted men, being organized in July 1973 into one separate Headquarter 'C' Detachment, along with three 'B' Detachments and 18 'A' Detachments in turn organized into three Special Forces Groups (SFGs).  Unlike an American A-Team however, Khmer SF 'A' Detachments could field up to 15 men, the additional personnel being psychological warfare specialists.  They were structured as follows:

The 33-man 'C' Detachment, personally commanded by Brig. Gen. Thach Reng, which comprised three 25-man HQ 'B' Detachments sub-divided into five 15-man 'A' Detachments, was allocated at the Cambodian capital and served as Headquarters for the Khmer Special Forces Command.
The 1st Special Forces Group, led by Major (later, Colonel) Kim Phong was composed of one 25-man 'B' Detachment and six 15-man 'A' Detachments (A-111, A-112, A-113, A-114, A-115, A-116) deployed in Battambang province.
The 2nd Special Forces Group, led by Captain Sok Thach comprising the B-12 Detachment and six 'A' Detachments (A-121, A-122, A-123, A-124, A-125, A-126) was stationed in Phnom Penh.
The 3rd Special Forces Group, led by Captain Thach Saren was composed of the B-13 Detachment and six 'A' Detachments (A-131, A-132, A-133, A-134, A-135, A-136). The 3rd SFG was given responsibility for operations around the capital, along the lower Mekong-Bassac river corridors, and the coastline.

Composition
Khmer Special Forces members' were all airborne-qualified volunteers, though most of the initial cadre was actually formed by "repatriated" ethnic Khmer recruits from the Khmer Krom minority living in South Vietnam.  Traditionally aggressive, the Khmer Krom brought with them years of combat experience gained while fighting in the irregular counterinsurgency MIKE Force and CIDG units in South Vietnam under the control of the USSF and the Military Assistance Command, Vietnam – Studies and Observations Group (MACV-SOG).  The program began in May 1970 when the Americans assembled a first batch of 2,000 Khmer Krom veteran soldiers and airlifted them to Cambodia. Consequently, by February 1972 both the 1st SFG (raised in Cambodia) and 2nd SFG (formed and trained in Thailand) had a large percentage of Khmer Krom repatriates, but gradually native Cambodian recruits began to supplant them over time.  Unlike the previous two groups, 3rd SFG, brought to strength in December 1972 and also sent to Thailand for training, had few experienced Khmer Krom members. In fact, one of its A-detachments was filled entirely by Khmer Loeu highlanders from northeastern Cambodia.

Khmer Special Forces' missions
The missions performed by the Khmer Special Forces during the war were many and varied, ranging from long-range strategic and tactical reconnaissance to deep-penetration raids, pathfinding, and reinforcement duties. In the special forces' unconventional training role, they also raised paramilitary self-defense village militias in rural areas situated behind enemy lines, as well as training airfield security battalions for the Khmer Air Force (KAF) at the Ream infantry training centre. In addition, the Khmer Special Forces provided LRRP instructors for the FANK Recondo School at Battambang which first opened in November 1972.

Combat operations 1971-74
Besides unconventional warfare and training operations, the Khmer Special Forces were also engaged on some notable combat operations in support of FANK regular troops. The first true combat assignment of the Khmer Special Forces occurred in May 1972, when they participated in a search-and-destroy operation alongside Army units around Phnom Penh to clear its northern outskirts of Khmer Rouge and NVA light artillery teams, who were harassing the quarters of the Cambodian capital with 122mm rocket and 75mm recoilless rifle fire.

In September 1973, the Khmer Special Forces spearheaded the combined Cambodian Army-Khmer National Navy (MNK)  amphibious operation "Castor 21" to retake the provincial capital of Kampong Cham, which had been stormed by Khmer Rouge forces in August. Just prior to the assault, two 'A' Detachments were inserted by helicopter into the insurgent-held southern quarter of the city and used LAW rockets to neutralize an enemy stronghold.  The role of the Khmer Special Forces teams at the Battle of Kampong Cham was not limited to combat assignments though; their radio operators also assisted coordinating the Khmer Air Force in carrying out successfully aerial resupply drops on behalf of FANK ground units defending the retaken city.

This coordinating role was again resumed on June–July 1974 during the siege of the district capital of Kampong Seila in Koh Kong Province, located some 135 Kilometers (84 Miles) south-west of Phnom Penh, down Route 4. At the time, this small town and its beleaguered Government garrison were enduring  a record eight-month-long siege by Khmer Rouge forces, with the local civilian population already suffering from starvation. Deviating from the Cambodian Army's standard communications procedures, the garrison made desperate radio appeals to Phnom Penh for relief, a fact that arouse suspicions in the FANK High Command. Fearing that Government relief forces were being lured into a trap, it was decided to send first observers to assess the situation at Kampong Seila and to verify the loyalty of the garrison. After two unsuccessful attempts, a Khmer Special Forces team was heli-lifted into the town and after confirming the reports, aerial ressuply operations were sanctioned to alleviate the starvation and allow the Army garrison to hold out against further insurgent pressure.

The final days 1974-75

By March 1975 with all land and river routes leading to Phnom Penh cut, the Khmer Rouge began their final assault on the Cambodian capital.  Aside from three 'A' Detachments operating in Battambang and two in Siem Reap, the bulk of the Khmer Special Forces under Brig. Gen. Thach Reng were withdrawn to Phnom Penh to assist in its defense. Two teams secured the Olympic Stadium, where seven KAF UH-1H transport helicopters were being kept to evacuate key members of the government. 
On the morning of April 17, 1975, after supervising the heliborne evacuation of only a handful of top officials and their families from the improvised helipad at the Olympic Stadium (three of the helicopters had to be abandoned due to technical malfunctions), Brig. Gen. Reng handed over the command of the Khmer SF to Colonel Kim Phong and boarded the last helicopter to abandon the Stadium. Left to fend for themselves, Col. Phong and his subordinates planned a massive breakout by land to the south-east towards the South Vietnamese border.  Although the Khmer Special Forces escape force managed to sneak out across the southern suburbs of the capital, they never reached the border and were all presumed killed in action.

The remaining Khmer Special Forces teams defending the last government-held holdouts at Battambang, including the teaching staff of the Recondo School, and Siem Reap reportedly tried to escape in small groups to Thailand by treeking across hostile territory.  
Only a handful of Special Forces personnel managed to evade enemy patrols and reach the Thai-Cambodian border; the rest was either killed in action or captured and sent to the Khmer Rouge-run labour camps (also known as the “Killing Fields”), where they died after enduring the terrible working and living conditions during the late 1970s.

Controversy
A highly capable and well-trained force, unfortunately the Khmer Special Forces remained too small to have a strategic impact in the war. Casualties and manpower shortages affected their tactical deployment which rarely matched the proposed organization, with many 'A' Detachments actually falling below strength.  Khmer Special Forces personnel often found themselves being employed in unsuitable tasks to which they had not been trained – in reality, many FANK regional commanders misused them as conventional shock troops on many occasions, such as the sieges and subsequent battles of Kampong Cham and Kampong Seila in 1973–74. Furthermore, a large portion of 2nd Special Forces Group's personnel were siphoned off to protect Phnom Penh from the threat of internal coups d'état, while two more 'A' Detachments from the 3rd SFG were assigned security duties as a VIP protection squad for President Lon Nol when he visited his villa on the coastal city of Kampong Som.

Khmer Special Forces’ Command

Para-Commando Battalion
The Khmer Special Forces Command was augmented in late 1974 when they assumed operational control over the newly formed Para-Commando Battalion (Bataillon de Commandos Parachutistes – BCP in French).  In March 1975, loosely under assignment to the Khmer SF, the Para-Commandos were sent to man the defensive perimeter north-west of Phnom Penh.

Weapons and equipment
The Khmer Special Forces used the standard weaponry and equipment of US origin issued to FANK units, complemented by captured Soviet or Chinese small-arms such as AK-47 assault rifles that allowed Special Forces personnel to use ammunition retrieved from enemy caches while on operations.

 FN GP35 Pistols 
 Colt.45 M1911A1 Pistols 
 Smith & Wesson Model 39 Pistols
 TT-33 Pistols
 Smith & Wesson Model 10 Revolver
 Type 56 assault rifle 
 Type 56-1 Assault rifle 
 AKM Assault rifle
 AK-47 Assault rifle
 AKS-47 Assault rifle
 M16A1 Assault rifle 
 CAR-15 Assault carbine
 Ithaca Model 37 pump-action shotguns 
 RPD Light machine gun
 Type 56 Light machine gun
 M60 machine gun
 RPG-2 Rocket-propelled grenade
 RPG-7 Rocket-propelled grenade
 M72 LAW Anti-tank rocket launcher
 M79 grenade launcher 
 M203 grenade launcher 
 M19 Mortar 60 mm
 M29 Mortar 81 mm
 M18 Claymore anti-personnel mines

See also 
 Cambodian Navy SEALs

Notes

References

Kenneth Conboy, FANK: A History of the Cambodian Armed Forces, 1970-1975, Equinox Publishing (Asia) Pte Ltd, Djakarta 2011. 
Kenneth Conboy, Kenneth Bowra, and Mike Chappell, The War in Cambodia 1970-75, Men-at-arms series 209, Osprey Publishing Ltd, London 1989. 
Kenneth Conboy and Simon McCouaig, South-East Asian Special Forces, Elite series 33, Osprey Publishing Ltd, London 1991. 
Sak Sutsakhan, The Khmer Republic at War and the Final Collapse, U.S. Army Center of Military History, Washington D.C. 1980. – available online at Part 1Part 2Part 3 Part 4.

Secondary sources

Gordon L. Rottman and Ron Volstad, US Army Special Forces 1952-84, Elite series 4, Osprey Publishing Ltd, London 1985. 
Gordon L. Rottman and Ron Volstad, US Army Rangers & LRRP units 1942-87, Elite series 13, Osprey Publishing Ltd, London 1987. 
Gordon L. Rottman and Ron Volstad, Vietnam Airborne, Elite series 29, Osprey Publishing Ltd, London 1990. 
Gordon L. Rottman and Kevin Lyles, Green Beret in Vietnam 1957–73, Warrior series 28, Osprey Publishing Ltd, Oxford 2002. 
Gordon L. Rottman, US Grenade Launchers – M79, M203, and M320, Weapon series 57, Osprey Publishing Ltd, Oxford 2017. 
Kevin Lyles, Vietnam ANZACs – Australian & New Zealand Troops in Vietnam 1962-72, Elite series 103, Osprey Publishing Ltd, Oxford 2004.

External links
Khmer National Armed Forces veterans site
Cambodian camouflage patterns 1953-1975
List of Khmer SF camouflage patterns 1971-75

Military history of Cambodia
Special forces of Cambodia
Military units and formations disestablished in 1975